is a Japanese politician of the Liberal Democratic Party (LDP), a member of the House of Representatives in the Diet (national legislature). A native of Ōmagari, Akita, he attended Keio University and received a master's degree from the School of International and Public Affairs at Columbia University in the United States. He was elected to the House of Representatives for the first time in 2003 as an independent and joined the LDP in the following year.

References

External links 
 Official website in Japanese.

1964 births
Living people
Politicians from Akita Prefecture
Keio University alumni
School of International and Public Affairs, Columbia University alumni
Members of the House of Representatives (Japan)
Liberal Democratic Party (Japan) politicians
21st-century Japanese politicians